Auger Hill is a hill in Antarctica. It was named by the New Zealand Geographic Board in 1994. As shallow soil deposits occur on the summit, an auger was used to obtain deep samples, giving the hill its name.

References
 

Hills of Victoria Land
Scott Coast